Heartland is a Canadian family drama television series which debuted on CBC on October 14, 2007.  Heartland follows sisters Amy and Lou Fleming, their grandfather Jack Bartlett, and Ty Borden through the highs and lows of life at their horse ranch in the fictional town of Hudson, Alberta.

The plot focuses on Amy, who inherited her mother's ability to heal abused and damaged horses after a tragic accident that led to significant changes in the lives of the characters.

Heartland airs in Canada on CBC at 7 pm (7:30 pm in Newfoundland) on Sundays. The series also airs in the United States on the UpTV and formerly on the defunct Light TV digital broadcast network. It is also distributed online on Netflix internationally (excluding Canada). The series previously also aired on The CW before being transferred solely to UP by 2010. The show became the longest-running one-hour scripted drama in Canadian television history on October 19, 2014, when it surpassed the previous 124-episode record set by Street Legal.   The fourteenth season premiered in Canada on January 10, 2021, and airing later in the United States on UP's UP Faith and Family streaming service on May 6, 2021 and premiered on linear Up TV starting July 8, 2021 as part of the summer Thursday night programming schedule. The fifteenth season premiered on Up Faith & Family starting in March 17, 2022 and premiered later on Up TV on May 19. The show was renewed for a 15-episode 16th season on June 1, 2022 and started production on the same day. It is set to debut in the fall in Canada and will later in spring 2023 on Up Faith and Family and in the summer on the main Up TV channel in the US.

Series overview

Episodes

Season 1 (2007-08)

Season 2 (2008-09)

Season 3 (2009-10)

Season 4 (2010-11)

Television film (2010)
The film aired on CBC Television in Canada and the Hallmark Channel in the US (instead of UP TV, which did not air it until a few years later).

Season 5 (2011-12)

Season 6 (2012-13)

Season 7 (2013-14)

Season 8 (2014-15)

Season 9 (2015-16)

Season 10 (2016-17)

Season 11 (2017-18)

Season 12 (2019)

Season 13 (2019)

Season 14 (2021)

Season 15 (2021)

Season 16 (2022-23)

References

External links
 Official website
 Heartland USA
 List of Heartland episodes at the Internet Movie Database
 List of Heartland episodes at epguides.com

Lists of Canadian drama television series episodes